Steyermarkochloa is a genus of plants in the grass family. The only known species is Steyermarkochloa angustifolia , which is native to Colombia (Guainía), Venezuela (Amazonas), and Brazil (Amazonas).

The genus name of Steyermarkochloa is in honour of Julian Alfred Steyermark (1909–1988), an American botanist. The Latin specific epithet of angustifolia is a compound word, with 'angusti-' derived from angustatus meaning narrowed and 'folia' meaning flower. The genus was first described and published in Ann. Missouri Bot. Gard. Vol.71 on page 995 in 1985. Then the species was first published in Ann. Missouri Bot. Gard. Vol.77 on page 204 in 1990.

References

External links
Grassbase - The World Online Grass Flora

Panicoideae
Flora of the Amazon
Grasses of South America
Grasses of Brazil
Monotypic Poaceae genera
Plants described in 1985
Flora of Colombia
Flora of Venezuela
Flora of North Brazil